The international E-road network is a numbering system for roads in Europe developed by the United Nations Economic Commission for Europe (UNECE). The network is numbered from E1 up and its roads cross national borders. It also reaches Central Asian countries like Kyrgyzstan, since they are members of the UNECE.

Main international traffic arteries in Europe are defined by ECE/TRANS/SC.1/2016/3/Rev.1 which consider three types of roads: motorways, limited access roads, and ordinary roads.

In most countries, the roads carry the European route designation alongside national designations. Belgium, Norway and Sweden have roads which only have the European route designations (examples: E18 and E6). The United Kingdom, Albania and the Asian part of Russia only use national road designations and do not show the European designations at all. Andorra does not number its routes at all except in internal circumstances. Denmark only uses the European designations on signage, but also has formal names for every motorway (or part of such), by which the motorways are referred to, for instance in news and weather forecasts. In Asia, Turkey and Russia show the European designations on signage; this is not the case in many other Asian countries.

Other continents have similar international road networks, e.g., the Pan-American Highway in the Americas, the Trans-African Highway network, and the Asian Highway Network.

History

UNECE was formed in 1947, and their first major act to improve transport was a joint UN declaration no. 1264, the Declaration on the Construction of Main International Traffic Arteries, signed in Geneva on 16 September 1950, which defined the first E-road network. Originally it was envisaged that the E-road network would be a motorway system comparable to the US Interstate Highway System. The declaration was amended several times until 15 November 1975, when it was replaced by the European Agreement on Main International Traffic Arteries or "AGR", which set up a route numbering system and improved standards for roads in the list. The AGR last went through a major change in 1992 and in 2001 was extended into Central Asia to include the Caucasus nations. There were several minor revisions since, last in 2008.

Numbering system

The route numbering system is as follows:
 Reference roads and intermediate roads, called Class-A roads, have numbers from 1 to 129.
North–south routes have odd numbers; east–west routes have even numbers. The two main exceptions are E4 and E6, both north–south routes.
The allocation of numbers progresses upwards from west to east and from north to south, with some exceptions.
 Branch, link and connecting roads, called Class-B roads, have three-digit numbers above 130.
 Reference roads are roads numbered 5-95 ending with 0 or 5 or having odd numbers 101–129. They generally go across Europe and are usually several thousand kilometres long.
 North-south reference roads have numbers that end with the digit 5 from 5 to 95, or odd numbers from 101 to 129, increasing from west to east.
 East-west reference roads have two-digit numbers that end with the digit 0, increasing from north to south.
 Intermediate roads are roads numbered 1 to 99 that are not reference roads. They are usually considerably shorter than the reference roads. They have numbers between those of the reference roads between which they are located. Like reference roads, north–south intermediate roads have odd numbers; east–west roads have even numbers.
 Class-B roads have three-digit numbers: the first digit is that of the nearest reference road to the north, the second digit is that of the nearest reference road to the west, and the third digit is a serial number.
 North-south Class-A roads located eastwards of road E99 have three-digit odd numbers from 101 to 129. Other rules for Class-A roads above apply to these roads.
 Class-B roads located eastwards of E101 have 3-digit numbers beginning with 0, from 001 to 099.

Exceptions
In the first established and approved version, the road numbers were well ordered. Since then a number of exceptions to this principle have been allowed.

Two Class-A roads, E6 and E4 were originally scheduled to be renamed into E47 and E55, respectively. However, since Sweden and Norway have integrated the E-roads into their national networks, signposted as E6 and E4 throughout, a decision was made to keep the pre-1992 numbers for the roads in those two countries. These exceptions were granted because of the excessive expense connected with re-signing not only the long routes themselves, but also the associated road network in the area. The new numbers are, however, used from Denmark and southward, though, as do other European routes within Scandinavia. These two roads are the most conspicuous exceptions to the rule that even numbers signify west-to-east E-roads.

Further exceptions are: 
E67, going from Finland to the Czech Republic (wrong side of E75 and E77), assigned around year 2000, simply because it was best available number for this new route. 
Most of E63 in Finland (wrong side of E75)
 Part of E8 in Finland on the wrong side of E12 after a lengthening around 2002  
E82 (Spain and Portugal, wrong side of E80). 
These irregularities exist just because it is hard to maintain good order when extending the network, and the UNECE does not want to change road numbers unnecessarily.

Because the Socialist People's Republic of Albania refused to participate in international treaties such as the AGR, it was conspicuously excluded from the route scheme, with E65 and E90 making noticeable detours to go around it. In the 1990s, Albania opened up to the rest of Europe, but only ratified the AGR in August 2006, so its integration into the E-road network remains weak.

Signage

Where the European routes are signed, green signs with white numbers are used.

There are different strategies for determining how frequently to signpost the roads.
 Sweden, Norway and Denmark have integrated the E-road numbers into their networks, meaning that the roads usually have no other national number.
 In Belgium, E-numbers are traditionally associated with highways, even though other grade E-roads pass through the country. As a result, the E-number is signposted (and referred to) only on the highway portions of the E-road network, while for non-motorways only the national number (if any) is shown. On the highway portions of the E-network, the E-numbers are the standard and thus referred to in news bulletins rather than the national number. Serbia and Italy have a similar principle.
 In most countries the E-roads form a network on top of the national network. The green signs are frequent enough to show how to follow the roads, but do not usually show how to reach them.
 In some countries, like Croatia and Bulgaria, E-roads are well signposted, but they sometimes follow older routes instead of highways.
 In some countries, like Germany, Italy and Greece, E-roads are signposted only on motorways and main road itineraries.
 In Ireland the signposting of E-roads is specified in Chapter 2 of the 2010 Traffic Signs Manual published by the Department of Transport, and specifies that E-roads are to be signed on route confirmation signs only. The first E-road numbers were signed in July 2007 on the N11 bypass in Gorey. Since then they have gradually spread across the E-road network in Ireland.
 In a few European countries such as the United Kingdom, Albania, and many Asian countries such as Uzbekistan, the E-roads are not signposted at all.

Road design standards
The following design standards should be applied to Euroroutes unless there are exceptional circumstances (such as mountain passes etc.):
 Built-up areas shall be by-passed if they constitute a hindrance or a danger.
 The roads should preferably be motorways or express roads (unless traffic density is low so that there is no congestion on an ordinary road).
 They should be homogeneous and be designed for at least  (see Design speed). The motorways should be at least .
 Lane width should be at least  on straight sections of road. This guarantees adequate clearance for any vehicle having a superstructure of width  which is the maximum specified width in Directive 2002/7/EC of the European Parliament and of the Council which recognise some specific tolerances for some specific countries.
 Central reservations should be at least  unless there is a barrier between the two carriageways.
 Railway intersections should be at different levels.

These requirements are meant to be followed for road construction. When new E-roads have been added these requirements have not been followed stringently.

Cultural significance
In Belgium, for example, motorway E-numbers have taken on the same kind of persistent cultural integration and significance as M-numbers in the UK, or Interstate numbers in the United States. Local businesses will refer to, or even incorporate the road designator in their business name. The annual road cycling race "E3 Harelbeke" takes part of its name from the former E3 (the part between Antwerp and Lille was renamed E17 in 1992). The same applies to the retail chain "E5-mode" (E5-fashion) that started with shops easily accessible from the former E5 (renamed E40 in 1992).

List of roads

Notes to the listings
In the road listings below, a dash ('–') indicates a land road connection between two towns/cities—the normal case—while an ellipsis ('...') denotes a stretch across water.  Not all such places are connected by ferry, and operating ferry connections are usually run by private companies without support from the respective governments, i.e. they may cease operating at any time.

A Class roads

North-South reference
  – : Greenock – Glasgow – Preston – Birmingham – Southampton ... Le Havre – Paris – Orléans – Bordeaux – San Sebastián – Burgos – Madrid – Seville – Algeciras
  – : Inverness – Perth – Edinburgh – Newcastle – London – Folkestone – Dover ... Calais – Paris – Lyon – Orange – Narbonne – Girona – Barcelona – Tarragona – Castellón de la Plana – Valencia – Alicante – Murcia – Almería – Málaga – Algeciras
  – : Hook of Holland – Rotterdam – Eindhoven – Maastricht – Liège – Bastogne – Arlon – Luxembourg – Metz – Saint-Avold – Strasbourg – Mulhouse – Basel – Olten – Bern – Lausanne – Geneva – Mont Blanc – Aosta – Ivrea – Vercelli – Alessandria – Genoa ... Bastia – Porto-Vecchio – Bonifacio ... Porto Torres – Sassari – Cagliari ... Palermo
  – : Amsterdam – Utrecht – Arnhem – Emmerich – Oberhausen – Cologne – Frankfurt am Main – Heidelberg – Karlsruhe – Offenburg – Basel – Olten – Lucerne – Altdorf – Gotthard Pass – Bellinzona – Lugano – Chiasso – Como – Milan – Piacenza – Parma – Modena – Florence – Rome
  – : Alta – Kautokeino – Karesuvanto – Arvidsjaur – Östersund – Mora – Säffle – Gothenburg ... Frederikshavn – Aalborg – Aarhus – Vejle – Kolding – Flensburg – Hamburg – Hanover – Göttingen – Kassel – Fulda – Würzburg – Nuremberg – Munich – Rosenheim – Wörgl – Innsbruck – Brenner – Fortezza – Bolzano – Trento – Verona – Modena – Bologna – Cesena – Perugia – Fiano Romano – Naples – Salerno – Sicignano degli Alburni – Cosenza – Villa San Giovanni ... Messina – Catania – Siracusa – Rosolini – Gela
  – : Helsingborg ... Helsingør – Copenhagen – Køge – Vordingborg – Farø – Nykøbing Falster – Gedser ... Rostock – Berlin – Lübbenau – Dresden – Ústí nad Labem – Prague – Tábor – Linz – Salzburg – Villach – Tarvisio – Udine – Palmanova – Mestre – Ravenna – Cesena – Rimini – Fano – Ancona – Pescara – Canosa di Puglia – Bari – Brindisi ... Igoumenitsa – Preveza – Rhion – Patras – Pyrgos – Kalamata (E4 was meant to be part of this route, but kept old number)
  – : Malmö – Ystad ... Świnoujście – Wolin – Goleniów – Szczecin – Gryfino – Pyrzyce – Myślibórz – Gorzów Wielkopolski – Skwierzyna – Międzyrzecz – Świebodzin – Zielona Góra – Legnica – Jelenia Góra – Harrachov – Železný Brod – Turnov – Mladá Boleslav – Prague – Jihlava – Brno – Bratislava – Rajka – Csorna – Szombathely – Zalaegerszeg – Nagykanizsa – Letenye – Zagreb – Karlovac – Rijeka – Split – Dubrovnik – Petrovac – Podgorica – Bijelo Polje – Pristina – Skopje – Kičevo – Ohrid – Bitola – Niki – Vevi – Kozani – Larissa – Domokos – Lamia – Bralos – Itea – Antirrio – Rhion – Aigio – Corinth – Tripoli – Kalamata ... Kissamos – Chania
  – : Vardø – Vadsø – Varangerbotn – Utsjoki – Inari – Ivalo – Sodankylä – Rovaniemi – Kemi – Oulu – Jyväskylä – Heinola – Lahti – Helsinki ... Gdańsk – Świecie – Łódź – Częstochowa – Katowice – Žilina – Bratislava – Győr – Budapest – Szeged – Subotica – Novi Sad – Belgrade – Niš – Kumanovo – Skopje – Veles – Gevgelija – Evzoni – Thessaloniki – Katerini – Larissa – Lamia – Athens ... Chania – Heraklion – Agios Nikolaos – Sitia
  – : Klaipėda – Kaunas – Vilnius – Lida – Slonim – Kobryn – Dubno – Ternopil – Chernivtsi – Siret – Suceava – Roman – Urziceni – Bucharest – Giurgiu – Ruse – Byala – Veliko Tarnovo – Stara Zagora – Haskovo – Svilengrad – Ormenio – Kastanies – Didymoteicho – Alexandroupoli
  – : Saint Petersburg – Pskov – Gomel – Kyiv – Odessa ... Samsun – Merzifon
  – : Moscow – Kaluga – Bryansk – Hlukhiv – Kyiv
  – : Kirkenes – Murmansk – Petrozavodsk – Saint Petersburg – Moscow – Tula – Orel – Kharkiv – Simferopol – Alushta – Yalta
  – : Yaroslavl – Moscow – Voronezh – Novorossiysk
  – : Mineralnye Vody – Nalchik – Vladikavkaz – Stepantsminda – Mtskheta – Tbilisi – Marneuli – Bolnisi – Yerevan – Goris – Megri
  – : Moscow – Tambov – Povorino – Volgograd – Astrakhan – Makhachkala – Quba – Baku – Alyat – Astara
  – : Samara – Oral – Atyrau – Beineu – Shetpe – Zhetybai – Fetisovo – Bekdash – Türkmenbaşy – Serdar – Border of the Islamic Republic of Iran
  – : Chelyabinsk – Kostanay – Esil – Derzhavinsk – Arkalyk – Jezkazgan – Kyzylorda – Shymkent – Tashkent – Ayni – Dushanbe – Panji Poyon
  – : Ishim – Petropavl – Kokshetau – Astana – Karaganda – Balkhash – Burubaytal – Almaty – Bishkek – Naryn – Torugart Pass
  – : Omsk – Pavlodar – Semey – Georgiyevka – Maikapshagai

West-East reference
  – : Å – Svolvær – Lødingen – Evenes – Narvik – Kiruna – Töre – Luleå
  – : Shannon – Limerick – Dublin ... Liverpool – Manchester – Leeds – Kingston upon Hull ... Esbjerg – Copenhagen – Malmö – Helsingborg – Halmstad – Gothenburg – Skara – Örebro – Stockholm ... Tallinn – Narva – Saint Petersburg
  – : Cork – Waterford – Wexford – Rosslare ... Fishguard – Swansea – Bridgend – Cardiff – Newport – Bristol – London – Colchester – Ipswich – Felixstowe ... Hook of Holland – The Hague – Gouda – Utrecht – Amersfoort – Oldenzaal – Osnabrück – Bad Oeynhausen – Hanover – Braunschweig – Magdeburg – Berlin – Świebodzin – Poznań – Warsaw – Brest – Minsk – Smolensk – Moscow – Ryazan – Penza – Samara – Ufa – Chelyabinsk – Kurgan – Ishim – Omsk
  – : Calais – Bruges – Ghent – Brussels – Leuven – Liège – Eupen – Aachen – Cologne – Olpe – Wetzlar – Gießen – Bad Hersfeld – Eisenach – Erfurt – Gera – Chemnitz – Dresden – Görlitz – Legnica – Wrocław – Opole – Gliwice – Zabrze – Katowice – Kraków – Rzeszów – Jarosław – Korczowa – Lviv – Rivne – Zhytomyr – Kyiv – Kharkiv – Luhansk – Volgograd – Astrakhan – Atyrau – Beyneu – Qo‘ng‘irot – Nukus – Daşoguz – Bukhara – Navoiy – Samarkand – Jizzakh – Tashkent – Shymkent – Zhambyl – Bishkek – Almaty – Sary-Ozek – Taldykorgan – Ucharal – Taskesken – Ayagoz – Georgiyevka – Oskemen – Ridder
  – : Brest – Rennes – Le Mans – Paris – Reims – Metz – Saarbrücken – Mannheim – Heilbronn – Nuremberg – Rozvadov – Plzeň – Prague – Jihlava – Brno – Trenčín – Prešov – Košice – Vyšné Nemecké – Uzhhorod – Mukachevo – Stryj – Ternopil – Khmelnytskyi – Vinnytsia – Uman – Kropyvnytskyi – Dnipro – Donetsk – Rostov-on-Don – Armavir – Mineralnye Vody – Makhachkala
  – : Brest – Lorient – Vannes – Nantes – Angers – Tours – Orléans – Montargis – Auxerre – Beaune – Dole – Besançon – Belfort – Mulhouse – Basel – Zürich – Winterthur – St. Gallen – St. Margrethen – Bregenz – Lauterach – Feldkirch – Landeck – Imst – Telfs – Innsbruck – Wörgl – Rosenheim – Bad Reichenhall – Salzburg – Sattledt – Linz – Sankt Pölten – Vienna – Nickelsdorf – Mosonmagyaróvár – Budapest – Szolnok – Püspökladány – Oradea – Cluj-Napoca – Turda – Târgu Mureş – Braşov – Ploieşti – Bucharest – Urziceni – Slobozia – Hârşova – Constanţa – Agigea ... Poti – Senaki – Samtredia – Kutaisi – Khashuri – Gori – Tbilisi – Rustavi – Ganja – Yevlakh – Baku ... Türkmenbaşy – Serdar – Ashgabat – Tejen – Mary – Türkmenabat – Alat – Bukhara – Karshi – G‘uzor – Sherobod – Termez – Dushanbe – Jirgatal – Sary Tash – Irkeshtam
  – : A Coruña – Gijón – Bilbao – San Sebastián – Bordeaux – Clermont-Ferrand – Lyon – Chambéry – Susa – Turin – Alessandria – Tortona – Brescia – Verona – Mestre – Palmanova – Trieste – Postojna – Ljubljana – Zagreb – Slavonski Brod – Belgrade – Pančevo – Vršac – Timișoara – Drobeta-Turnu Severin – Craiova – Alexandria – Bucharest – Giurgiu – Ruse – Razgrad – Shumen – Varna ... Samsun – Ordu – Giresun – Trabzon – Batumi – Poti
  – : Lisbon – Valladolid – Burgos – San Sebastián – Toulouse – Nice – Genoa – Rome – Pescara ... Dubrovnik – Podgorica – Pristina – Niš – Sofia – Plovdiv – Istanbul – İzmit – Gerede – Amasya – Erzurum – Gürbulak – Iran
  – : Lisbon – Madrid – Barcelona ... Mazara del Vallo – Palermo – Messina ... Reggio Calabria – Metaponto – Taranto – Brindisi ... Igoumenitsa – Ioannina – Kozani – Thessaloniki – Alexandroupoli – Gelibolu ... Lapseki – Bursa – Ankara – Adana – Nusaybin – Khabur River – Iraq

North-South intermediate
  – : Larne – Belfast – Newry – Dublin – Wicklow – Rosslare ... A Coruña – Pontevedra – Vigo – Valença – Porto – Lisbon – Albufeira – Castro Marim – Huelva – Seville
  – : Cherbourg-Octeville – La Rochelle
 The E4 and E6 run north–south, but are listed as west–east routes
  – : Pau, Pyrénées-Atlantiques – Jaca – Zaragoza
  – : Orléans – Toulouse – Barcelona
  – : Vierzon – Montluçon – Clermont-Ferrand – Montpellier
  – : Leeds – Doncaster – Sheffield – Nottingham – Leicester – Northampton – London
  – : Antwerp – Beaune
  – : Amsterdam – Brussels – Paris
  – : Metz – Geneva
  – : Metz – Lausanne
  – : Belfort – Bern – Martigny – Aosta
  – : Cologne – Sarreguemines – E25 (towards Strasbourg)
  –  – Rotterdam – Ludwigshafen
  – : Parma – La Spezia
  – : Bremen – Cologne
  – : Trondheim – Orkanger – Vinjeøra – Halsa ... Straumsnes – Kristiansund Mainland Connection – Batnfjordsøra – Molde ... Vestnes – Skodje – Ålesund ... Volda – Nordfjordeid ... Sandane – Førde – Lavik ... Instefjord – Knarvik – Bergen – Os ... Stord – Sveio – Aksdal – Bokn ... Rennesøy – Randaberg – Stavanger – Sandnes – Helleland – Flekkefjord – Lyngdal – Mandal – Kristiansand ... Hirtshals – Hjørring – Nørresundby – Aalborg
  – : Dortmund – Wetzlar – Aschaffenburg – Würzburg – Stuttgart – Schaffhausen – Winterthur – Zürich – Altdorf
  – : Würzburg – Ulm – Lindau – Bregenz – St. Margrethen – Buchs – Chur – San Bernardino – Bellinzona
  – : Helsingborg ... Helsingør – Copenhagen – Køge – Vordingborg – Farø – Rødby ... Puttgarden – Oldenburg in Holstein – Lübeck (Most of the E6 route in Norway and Sweden was meant to be part of this route, but kept its old number)
  – : Magdeburg – Halle – Plauen – Schönberg – Vojtanov – Cheb – Karlovy Vary – Plzeň – České Budějovice – Halámky – Vienna
  – : Berlin – Leipzig – Gera – Hirschberg – Hof – Bayreuth – Nuremberg
  – : Plzeň – Bayerisch Eisenstein – Deggendorf – Munich
  – : Sattledt – Liezen – Sankt Michael – Graz – Maribor – Ljubljana
  – : Prague – Jihlava – Vienna – Graz – Spielfeld – Maribor – Zagreb
  – : Villach – Karawanks Tunnel – Naklo – Ljubljana – Trieste – Rijeka
  – : Sodankylä – Kemijärvi – Posio – Kuusamo – Kajaani – Iisalmi – Kuopio – Jyväskylä – Tampere – Turku
  – : Helsinki ... Tallinn – Riga – Kaunas – Warsaw – Piotrków Trybunalski – Wrocław – Kłodzko – Kudowa-Zdrój – Náchod – Hradec Králové – Prague; also known as the Via Baltica
  – : Nordkapp (North Cape) – Olderfjord
  – : Košice – Miskolc – Budapest – Balatonvilágos – Nagykanizsa – Zagreb – Karlovac – Knin – Split
  – : Budapest – Szekszárd – Mohács – Osijek – Odžak – Zenica – Sarajevo – Mostar – Metković
  – : Pskov – Riga – Šiauliai – Tolpaki – Kaliningrad ... Gdańsk – Elbląg – Warsaw – Radom – Kraków – Trstená – Ružomberok – Zvolen – Budapest
  – : Miskolc – Debrecen – Berettyóújfalu – Oradea – Beiuș – Deva – Petroșani – Târgu Jiu – Craiova – Calafat – Vidin – Vraca – Botevgrad – Sofia – Blagoevgrad – Serres – Thessaloniki
  – : Mukachevo – Halmeu – Satu Mare – Zalău – Cluj-Napoca – Turda – Sebeș – Sibiu – Pitești – Bucharest – Constanţa
  – : Byala – Pleven – Jablanica – Botevgrad – Sofia
  – : Odessa – Izmail – Reni – Galaţi – Tulcea – Constanţa – Varna – Burgas – Malko Tarnovo – Dereköy – Kırklareli – Babaeski – Havsa – Keşan – Gelibolu – Ayvalık – İzmir – Selçuk – Aydın – Denizli – Acıpayam – Korkuteli – Antalya
  – : Gerede – Kızılcahamam – Ankara
  – : Toprakkale – İskenderun – Antakya – Yayladağı – Syria
  – : Kherson – Dzhankoy – Novorossiysk – Sochi – Sokhumi – Zugdidi – Senaki
  – : Şanlıurfa – Diyarbakır – Bitlis – Doğubayazıt – Iğdır – Dilucu – Sadarak

West-East intermediate
  – : Helsingborg – Jönköping – Linköping – Norrköping – Nyköping – Södertälje – Stockholm – Uppsala – Sundsvall – Örnsköldsvik – Umeå – Luleå – Haparanda – Tornio (runs north–south, but listed as west–east. Was to be numbered as part of E55, but kept old number)
  – : Trelleborg – Malmö – Helsingborg – Halmstad – Gothenburg – Oslo – Hamar – Lillehammer – Dombås – Trondheim – Stjørdal – Steinkjer – Mosjøen – Mo i Rana – Rognan – Fauske ... Ballangen – Narvik – Setermoen – Alta – Olderfjord – Lakselv – Karasjok – Varangerbotn – Kirkenes (runs mostly north–south, but listed as west–east. Helsingborg - Alta was to be part of the E47, but kept old number)
  – : Tromsø – Nordkjosbotn – Skibotn – Kilpisjärvi – Kolari – Tornio – Kemi – Oulu – Kokkola – Vaasa – Pori – Turku
  – : Mo i Rana – Umeå ... Vaasa – Tampere – Hämeenlinna – Helsinki
  – : Trondheim – Östersund – Sundsvall
  – : Derry – Belfast ... Glasgow – Edinburgh ... Bergen – Arna – Voss – Lærdal – Tyin – Fagernes – Hønefoss – Sandvika – Oslo – Gardermoen – Kongsvinger – Torsby – Malung – Borlänge – Falun – Sandviken – Gävle
  – : Craigavon – Belfast – Larne ... Stranraer – Gretna – Carlisle – Newcastle ... Kristiansand – Arendal – Porsgrunn – Larvik – Sandefjord – Horten – Drammen – Oslo – Askim – Karlstad – Örebro – Västerås – Stockholm/Kapellskär ... Mariehamn ... Turku/Naantali – Helsinki – Kotka – Vaalimaa – Vyborg – Saint Petersburg
  – : Holyhead – Chester – Warrington – Manchester – Leeds – Doncaster – Immingham ... Amsterdam – Groningen – Bremen – Hamburg – Lübeck – Rostock – Sassnitz ... Trelleborg – Malmö – Kalmar – Norrköping ... Ventspils – Riga – Rēzekne – Velikiye Luki – Moscow – Vladimir – Nizhny Novgorod – Kazan – Yelabuga – Perm – (Asia) – Yekaterinburg – Tyumen – Ishim
  – : Birmingham – Cambridge – Ipswich
  – : Hamburg – Berlin
  – : Berlin – Szczecin – Goleniów – Koszalin – Słupsk – Gdynia – Gdańsk – Kaliningrad – Tolpaki – Nesterov – Marijampolė – Vilnius – Minsk
  – : Colchester – Harwich
  – : Zeebrugge – Antwerp – Eindhoven – Venlo – Oberhausen – Dortmund – Bad Oeynhausen
  – : Berlin – Lübbenau – Cottbus – Legnica
  – : Hlukhiv – Kursk – Voronezh – Saratov – Oral – Aktobe – Karabulak – Aral – Novokazalinsk – Kyzylorda – Shymkent
  – : Dunkirk – Lille – Mons – Charleroi – Namur – Liège – St. Vith – Wittlich – Bingen – Wiesbaden – Frankfurt am Main – Aschaffenburg
  – : Le Havre – Amiens – Charleville-Mézières – Luxembourg – Trier – Koblenz – Wetzlar – Gießen
  – : Cherbourg-Octeville – Caen – Rouen – Reims – Charleville-Mézières – Liège
  – : Schweinfurt – Bayreuth – Marktredwitz – Cheb – Karlovy Vary – Prague
  – : Strasbourg – Appenweier – Karlsruhe – Stuttgart – Ulm – Munich – Salzburg
  – : Paris – Chaumont – Mulhouse – Basel – Waldshut – Lindau – Munich
  – : Nuremberg – Regensburg – Passau – Wels – Sattledt
  – : Vienna – Bratislava – Zvolen – Košice – Uzhhorod – Mukachevo – Halmeu – Suceava – Iași – Sculeni – Chişinău – Odessa – Mykolaiv – Kherson – Melitopol – Taganrog – Rostov-on-Don
  – : Nantes – Poitiers – Mâcon – Geneva – Lausanne – Martigny – Sion – Simplon – Gravellona Toce – Milan – Tortona – Genoa
  – : Turin – Milan – Brescia
  – : Fortezza – Innichen – Spittal an der Drau – Villach – Klagenfurt – Graz – Veszprém – Székesfehérvár
  – : Szeged – Arad – Deva – Sibiu – Braşov
  – : Bordeaux – Toulouse
  – : Nice – Cuneo – Asti – Alessandria
  – : Pisa – Migliarino – Florence
  – : Grosseto – Arezzo – Sansepolcro – Fano
  – : Porto – Vila Real – Bragança – Zamora – Tordesillas
  – : Keşan – Tekirdağ – Silivri
  – : Krystallopigi – Florina – Vévi – Géfira
  – : Ankara – Yozgat – Sivas – Refahiye
  – ): Igoumenitsa – Ioannina – Trikala – Larissa – Volos
  – : Corinth – Megara – Attiki Odos (Elefsina – Athens Suburbs – Markopoulo Mesogeas).
  – : İzmir – Usak – Afyonkarahisar – Sivrihisar
  – : Topboğazi – Kırıkhan – Reyhanlı – Cilvegözü → Syria

B Class roads
  – : Haugesund – Røldal – Haukeli – Seljord – Kongsberg – Drammen – Vassum
  – : Ålesund – Tresfjord – Åndalsnes – Dombås
  – : Cork – Portlaoise
  – : Amsterdam – Amersfoort
  – : Amersfoort – Hoogeveen – Groningen
  – : Hoogeveen – Haselünne – Cloppenburg
  – : Cuxhaven – Bremerhaven – Bremen – Walsrode
  – : Sassnitz – Stralsund – Neubrandenburg – Berlin
  – : Świecie – Poznań – Wrocław
  – : Kaunas – Ukmergė – Daugavpils – Rēzekne – Ostrov
  – : Tallinn – Tartu – Võru – Luhamaa
  – : Jõhvi – Tartu – Valga – Valka – Valmiera – Incukalns
  – : Tallinn – Keila – Paldiski ... Kapellskär
  – : Minsk – Babruysk – Gomel (formerly began Klaipėda – Kaunas – Vilnius)
  – : Klaipėda – Palanga – Šiauliai – Panevėžys – Ukmergė – Vilnius
  – : Breda – Gorinchem – Utrecht
  – : Flushing – Breda – Eindhoven
  – : Antwerp – Liège
  – : Leuven – Hasselt – Heerlen – Aachen
  – : Dortmund – Kassel
  – : Radom – Rzeszów – Barwinek – Vyšný Komárnik – Svidník – Prešov
  – : Warsaw – Lublin – Lviv
  – : Lublin – Kovel – Rivne – Kyiv
  – : Trosna – Hlukhiv
  – : Saint-Brieuc – Caen
  – : Calais – Rouen – Le Mans
  – : Zeebrugge – Bruges – Roeselare – Kortrijk – Tournai
  – : Jabbeke – Zeebrugge (road never built)
  – : Brussels – Metz
  – : Nivelles – Charleroi – Reims
  – : Eynatten – Eupen – St. Vith – Luxembourg
  – : Trier – Saarbrücken
  – : Tournai – Halle
  – : Chemnitz – Plauen – Hof (E51)
  – : Karlovy Vary – Teplice – Turnov – Hradec Králové – Olomouc – Žilina
  – : Gießen – Frankfurt am Main – Mannheim
  – : Svitavy – Brno – Vienna
  – : Brno – Olomouc – Český Těšín – Katowice – Kraków
  – : Mukachevo – Lviv
  – : Le Mans – Angers
  – : Le Mans – Tours
  – : Courtenay – Troyes
  – : Remiremont – Mulhouse
  – : Offenburg – Donaueschingen
  – : Memmingen – Füssen
  – : Munich – Garmisch-Partenkirchen – Mittenwald – Seefeld – Innsbruck
  – : České Budějovice – Humpolec
  – : Munich – Braunau am Inn – Wels – Linz
  – : Bratislava – Zvolen – Košice
  – : Trenčín – Žiar nad Hronom
  – : Püspökladány – Nyíregyháza – Chop – Uzhhorod
  – : Bacău – Brașov – Pitești – Craiova
  – : Bratislava – Dunajská Streda – Medveďov – Vámosszabadi – Győr
  – : Cluj-Napoca – Dej (formerly continued Bistriţa – Suceava)
  – : Ploieşti – Buzău
  – : Sărățel – Reghin – Toplița – Gheorgheni – Miercurea-Ciuc – Sfântu Gheorghe – Chichiș
  – : Görbeháza – Nyíregyháza – Vásárosnamény – Beregdaróc
  – : Tișița – Tecuci – Albița – Leușeni – Chișinău – Odessa
  – : Săbăoani – Iași – Bălți – Mohyliv-Podilskyi – Vinnytsia – Zhytomyr
  – : Poltava – Kropyvnytskyi – Chişinău – Giurgiuleşti – Galaţi – Slobozia
  – : Krasnodar – Dzhubga
  – : Niort – La Rochelle
  – : La Rochelle – Saintes
  – : Saintes – Angoulême – Limoges (formerly to Sculeni)
  – : Tours – Vierzon
  – : Angoulême – Bordeaux
  – : Digoin – Chalon-sur-Saône
  – : Lyon – Pont-d'Ain
  – : Ivrea – Turin
  – : Wörgl – St. Johann in Tirol – Lofer – Salzburg
  – : Altenmarkt im Pongau – Liezen
  – : Klagenfurt – Loiblpass – Naklo
  – : Letenye – Tornyiszentmiklós
  – : Balatonkeresztúr – Nagyatád – Barcs – Virovitica – Okučani – Banja Luka – Jajce – Donji Vakuf – Zenica
  – : Subotica – Sombor – Osijek
  – : Timișoara – Arad – Oradea – Satu Mare
  – : Lugoj – Ilia
  – : Agigea – Negru Vodă – Kardam 
  – : Ashtarak – Gyumri – Ashotsk – Akhalkalaki – Akhaltsikhe – Vale, Georgia – Türkgözü – Posof – Kars – Horasan
  – : Supsa – Lanchkhuti – Samtredia
  – : Lyon – Grenoble
  – : Geneva – Chambéry – Marseille
  – : Valence – Grenoble
  – : Orange – Marseille
  – : Turin – Savona
  – : Rijeka – Pula – Koper
  – : Bihać – Jajce – Donji Vakuf – Zenica – Sarajevo – Užice – Čačak – Kraljevo – Kruševac – Pojate – Paraćin – Zaječar
  – : Sarajevo – Podgorica → Albania
  – : Belgrade – Čačak – Nova Varoš – Bijelo Polje
  – : Drobeta-Turnu Severin – Niš
  – : Yablanitsa – Veliko Tarnovo – Shumen
  – : Popovica – Stara Zagora – Burgas
  – : Coimbra – Viseu – Vila Real – Chaves – Verín
  – : Bragança – Guarda – Castelo Branco – Portalegre – Évora – Beja – Ourique
  – : Salamanca – Mérida – Seville
  – : Bilbao – Logroño – Zaragoza
  – : Vila Nova de Famalicão – Chaves
  – : Torres Novas – Abrantes – Castelo Branco – Guarda
  – : Rome – San Cesareo
  – : Sassari – Olbia ... Civitavecchia – ends at E80
  – : Avellino – Salerno
  – : Naples – Avellino – Benevento – Canosa di Puglia
  – : Bari – Taranto
  – : Spezzano Albanese – Sybaris
  – : Cosenza – Crotone
  – : Sicignano degli Alburni – Potenza – Metaponto
  – : Sant'Eufemia Lamezia – Catanzaro
  – : Petrovac → Albania → Prizren – Pristina
  – : Ohrid → Albania
  – : Ioannina → Albania
  – : Sofia – Kyustendil – Kumanovo
  – : İzmit – Bursa – Balıkesir – Manisa – İzmir – Çeşme
  – : Madrid – Valencia
  – : Jaén – Granada – Málaga
  – : Mérida – Ciudad Real – Albacete – Alicante
  – : Mazara del Vallo – Gela
  – : Buonfornello – Enna – Catania
  – : Alcamo – Trapani
  – : Ioannina – Arta – Agrinio – Missolonghi
  – : Aktio – Vonitsa – Amfilochia – Karpenisi – Lamia
  – : Tripoli – Sparti – Gytheio
  – : Eleusina – Thebes
  – : Afyon – Konya – Junction (Aksaray-Pozantı) (on the State road linking Ankara and Mersin on E90)
  – : Mersin – Junction Tarsus East (on the motorway linking Ankara and Adana on E90)
  – : Tbilisi – Marneuli – Sadakhlo – Bagratashen – Vanadzor
  – : Alyat – Saatly Rayon – Megri – Ordubad – Julfa – Nakhchivan – Sadarak
  – : Uchkuduk – Daşoguz – Ashgabat – Gaudan
  – : Kyzylorda – Uchkuduk – Bukhara (NB: most of road not built)
  – : G‘uzor – Samarkand
  – : Ayni – Kokand
  – : Tashkent – Kokand – Andijan – Osh – Irkeshtam
  – : Dushanbe – Kulob – Kalaikhumb – Khorugh – Murghab – Kulma Pass – border of China (see Pamir Highway)
  – : Jirgatal – Khorugh – Ishkoshim – Lyanga – China
  – : Osh – Bishkek
  – : Kokpek – Kegen – Tyup
  – : Almaty – Kokpek – Chundzha – Koktal – Khorgas
  – : Sary-Ozek – Koktal
  – : Usharal – Druzhba
  – : Taskesken – Bakhty
  – : Zapadnoe – Zhaksy – Atbasar – Astana
  – : Yelabuga – Ufa
  – : Jezkazgan – Karaganda – Pavlodar – Uspenovka
  – : Petropavl – Zapadnoe

Notable E-roads

 E80, together with Asian Highway 1, crosses all of Europe and Asia, linking Lisbon with Tokyo.
 The shortest E-road is E844, in the Italian region of Calabria
 Northernmost is E69, North Cape, Norway, 71°10' N
 Westernmost is E1, Lisbon, Portugal, 9°10' W
 Southernmost is E75, Crete, Greece, 35°6' N
 Easternmost is E127, Maykapshagay, Kazakhstan, 85°36' E
 The highest E-road is E008 which reaches  altitude in the Pamir Mountains in Tajikistan.
 The highest E-road in Europe is E62 reaching  at the Simplon Pass, Switzerland.
E16 includes 60 tunnels, covering about 15% of the road's  within Norway.
 The E39 includes 9 ferry crossings.
 The E39 includes 90 tunnels, 6% of the road's  within Norway.

Historical numbering
These were the historical roads before 1975:

See also

 
 
 
 
 National Road network (Netherlands) a former system devised to complement the E-road network at a national level:
 Other intercontinental highway systems:

Notes

References

External links

 
 European roads and cities map built on OpenStreetMap's data
 EU Transport Networks home page
 
 UNECE document ECE/TRANS/SC.1/2016/03/Rev1 "European  On Main International Traffic Arteries (AGR)"; 1 November 2016 (PDF file, official E route list starting at p. 9)
 Map of E-road network - UNECE document (2007)
 Routes in Benelux as well as E routes in Europe
 Trans-Global Highway and the Eur-Africa Friendship Tunnel

 
Lists of roads
Road transport in Europe
Europe transport-related lists
United Nations Economic Commission for Europe